The Women's artistic individual all-around competition Gymnastics at the 2015 Summer Universiade in Gwangju was held on 6 July at the Gwangju Women's University Universiade Gymnasium.

Schedule
All times are Korea Standard Time (UTC+09:00)

Results

References

Results

External links
Official website

Women's artistic individual all-around
2015 in women's gymnastics